Eupithecia zelmira is a moth in the family Geometridae first described by Louis W. Swett and Samuel E. Cassino in 1920. It is found in the US states of Oregon and California.

The wingspan is about 20 mm. The forewings are white with four brown patches along the costa and a somewhat darker terminal area with smoky brown suffusion. Adults have been recorded on wing from February to July and in December.

References

Moths described in 1920
zelmira
Moths of North America